Trevor Reckling (born May 22, 1989) is an American professional baseball player who is currently a free agent.

Career
In 2009, Reckling had a successful season in the minor league system. Originally, the organization expected to have him in the Class A California League, but after the death of pitcher Nick Adenhart, Reckling was needed at Double-A Arkansas when Sean O'Sullivan was promoted to Triple-A Salt Lake. Reckling made the All-Star team, the Futures Game, and played for Team USA at the end of the season. MLB.com picked Reckling as the Angels organization's Pitcher of the Year, saying, "What didn't the young lefty do? He turned 20 in May, yet led the organization in ERA (2.68) and was second in strikeouts (122). His 2.93 ERA and 106 K's in the Texas League were good making him the youngest player for the Texas League. Then, for good measure, he went 2–0 with a 0.69 ERA in three starts for Team USA during its IBAF World Cup gold medal run. Trevor broke a Guinness Book World Record versus China striking out 11 tying Burt Hootens three decade old record for Team Usa."

Reckling was ranked the fourth best prospect in the Angels' organization after the 2009 season by Baseball Prospectus writer Kevin Goldstein as well as by Baseball America. Goldstein noted Reckling could force his way into a rotation shot by 2011, as a possible third starter, and could start the 2010 season as high as Triple-A. After former Angels ace John Lackey signed with the Boston Red Sox, the Orange County Register reporter Mark Whicker went so far as to say that Reckling "should get to Anaheim at some point in 2010."

On April 10, 2012, the Angels released Reckling. He had allowed 15 walks and 14 earned runs in 6 2/3 innings at Class A in the season to date.

Reckling spent the 2013 season pitching for the independent Bridgeport Bluefish of the Atlantic League of Professional Baseball.

On November 2, 2013, the Cincinnati Reds signed him to a minor league contract.

He signed a minor league contract with the Arizona Diamondbacks in February 2015.

He signed a contract with the Curaçao Neptunus of the Honkbal Hoofdklasse in 2017.

On April 18, 2019, Reckling signed with the York Revolution of the Atlantic League of Professional Baseball. He was released on May 8, 2019.

Pitch repertoire
Reckling's fastball has average velocity but has strong sinking action. His changeup is projected to be effective as an 'out' pitch. Because of the strong break on his pitches and a complicated delivery, Reckling often struggles with control.

References

External links

1989 births
Arkansas Travelers players
Arizona League Angels players
Bridgeport Bluefish players
Cedar Rapids Kernels players
Curacao Neptunus players
American expatriate baseball players in the Netherlands
Living people
Rancho Cucamonga Quakes players
Salt Lake Bees players
York Revolution players